Richard Edward Scott (born July 19, 1962) is an American former professional baseball shortstop, who played in Major League Baseball (MLB) for the Oakland Athletics. He later served as a coach for the New York Mets.

Career

Playing career
Scott appeared in three big league games during the 1989 season for the Oakland Athletics. He was drafted by the New York Yankees in the 17th round of the 1981 Major League Baseball draft.

Coaching career
Since retiring from the field, Scott has been a minor league manager for the Athletics and Arizona Diamondbacks, a scout for the Diamondbacks, player development director of the Toronto Blue Jays, and field coordinator of instruction for the Houston Astros and New York Mets. He also served as Director of Player Development for the Mets under Sandy Alderson, for whom Scott had previously worked in the Oakland organization.

On December 16, 2015, Scott was announced as the new bench coach of the Mets, succeeding Bob Geren. He served in the position through the 2016 and 2017 seasons before leaving the Mets to become player development director for the Miami Marlins.

In 2021, Scott returned to the Mets organization as coordinator of coaching development and instruction. After Glenn Sherlock tested positive for Covid-19 in 2022, Scott temporarily joined the Mets' MLB coaching staff as bench coach, beginning April 16, 2022.

References

External links

1962 births
Living people
Albany-Colonie Yankees players
Arizona Diamondbacks scouts
Baseball players from Maine
Columbus Clippers players
Fort Lauderdale Yankees players
Gulf Coast Yankees players
Major League Baseball farm directors
Major League Baseball shortstops
Nashville Sounds players
New York Mets executives
New York Mets coaches
Miami Marlins executives
Oakland Athletics players
People from Ellsworth, Maine
Tacoma Tigers players
Toronto Blue Jays executives
Major League Baseball bench coaches